The 2011 Cork Senior Football Championship was the 113th staging of the Cork Senior Football Championship since its establishment by the Cork County Board in 1887. The draw for the opening round fixtures took place on 11 December 2010. The championship began on 14 March 2011 and ended on 16 October 2011.

Nemo Rangers entered the championship as the defending champions, however, they were defeated by Avondhu at the quarter-final stage.

On 16 October 2011, University College Cork won the championship following a 1-12 to 0-10 defeat of Castlehaven in the final. This was their 10th championship title overall and their first title since 1999.

Avondhu's Cian O'Riordan was the championship's top scorer with 1-27.

Team changes

To Championship

Promoted from the Cork Premier Intermediate Football Championship
 Newcestown

From Championship

Relegated to the Cork Premier Intermediate Football Championship
 Mallow

Results

Divisional selection

Group 1 table

Group 1 results

Group 2 table

Group 2 results

Knock-out stage

Round 1

Round 2

Round 3

Relegation play-off

Round 4

Quarter-finals

Semi-finals

Final

Championship statistics

Top scorers

Top scorers overall

Top scorers in a single game

Miscellaneous

 University College Cork qualify for the final for the first time since 1999.
 University College Cork won the championship for the first time since 1999.

References

External link

 2011 Cork Senior Football Championship results

Cork Senior Football Championship